Dębska Kuźnia , German: Dembiohammer is a village in the administrative district of Gmina Chrząstowice, within Opole County, Opole Voivodeship, in south-western Poland.

References

Villages in Opole County